Cosmosoma braconoides is a moth of the family Erebidae. It was described by Francis Walker in 1854. It is found in Mexico and Honduras.

References

braconoides
Moths described in 1854